Ofatulena is a genus of moths belonging to the family Tortricidae.

Species
Ofatulena duodecemstriata (Walsingham, 1884)
Ofatulena jamaicana (Walsingham, 1897)
Ofatulena luminosa Heinrich, 1926

See also
List of Tortricidae genera

References

External links
tortricidae.com

Tortricidae genera
Olethreutinae